In Greek mythology, Piren (Ancient Greek: Πειρῆνα means 'fasten by the ends') or Peiren (Πειρῆνος) may refer to the following personages: 

Piren, a king of Argos and father of Io.
 Piren, a Boeotian prince as the son of King Glaucus of Potniae and possibly, Eurymede or Eurynome, daughter of King Nisus of Megara. He was unintentionally killed by his own brother Bellerophon. According to some traditions, he was called Alcimenes or Deliades.

Notes

References 

 Apollodorus, The Library with an English Translation by Sir James George Frazer, F.B.A., F.R.S. in 2 Volumes, Cambridge, MA, Harvard University Press; London, William Heinemann Ltd. 1921. ISBN 0-674-99135-4. Online version at the Perseus Digital Library. Greek text available from the same website.
 Gaius Julius Hyginus, Fabulae from The Myths of Hyginus translated and edited by Mary Grant. University of Kansas Publications in Humanistic Studies. Online version at the Topos Text Project.
 Hesiod, Catalogue of Women from Homeric Hymns, Epic Cycle, Homerica translated by Evelyn-White, H G. Loeb Classical Library Volume 57. London: William Heinemann, 1914. Online version at theio.com

Princes in Greek mythology
Boeotian characters in Greek mythology
Boeotian mythology